Fatimah Abbas Waheeb Al-Kaabi (born 23 April 2000) is an Iraqi sports shooter. She competed in the women's 10 metre air pistol event at the 2020 Summer Olympics.

References

External links
 

2000 births
Living people
Iraqi female sport shooters
Olympic shooters of Iraq
Shooters at the 2020 Summer Olympics
Place of birth missing (living people)
Shooters at the 2018 Summer Youth Olympics